Geissois imthurnii is a species of forest tree belonging to the plant family Cunoniaceae. It is endemic to Fiji.

References

imthurnii
Endemic flora of Fiji
Trees of Fiji
Endangered flora of Oceania
Taxonomy articles created by Polbot